Harrison Ellenshaw (born Peter Samuel Ellenshaw, July 20, 1945, in Harrisburg, Pennsylvania) is an American matte painter, following his British father Peter Ellenshaw. He started his career at Walt Disney Studios. He later joined George Lucas's effects studio Industrial Light and Magic (ILM), where he produced many of the matte visual effects backgrounds for the films Star Wars (1977) and The Empire Strikes Back (1980). He then returned to Disney and worked on the 1979 film The Black Hole, for which he and his father were nominated for an Academy Award for their work. He also worked on The Watcher in the Woods (1980), and Tron (1982), for which he was Visual Effects Supervisor, and Dick Tracy (1990). He eventually headed Disney Studio's effects department, Buena Vista Visual Effects (BVVE).

Harrison Ellenshaw is now pursuing his passion for fine art painting. His son Michael Ellenshaw has directed a short film while his sister Lynda Thompson is also a visual effects artist.

Selected filmography 
 The Man Who Fell To Earth (1976),  special photographic effects - credited as P.S. Ellenshaw
 Star Wars (1977), matte artist
 The Black Hole (1979), miniature effects creator (Academy Award nominee for visual effects)
 The Empire Strikes Back (1980), matte artist
 Tron (1982), visual effects supervisor and associate producer
 Superman IV: The Quest for Peace (1987), visual effects supervisor and second unit director
 Dick Tracy (1990), matte artist
 Prop Culture (2020), himself, Episode: "Tron"

References

External links
 Ellenshaw.com, official biography website
 
 Interview with Harrison Ellenshaw on the Matte Shot - A Tribute to Golden Era Special FX blog

1945 births
20th-century American painters
American male painters
21st-century American painters
21st-century American male artists
Living people
Artists from Harrisburg, Pennsylvania
Painters from Pennsylvania
American people of English descent
20th-century American male artists